Andrés Arturo García Menéndez (born April 12, 1956), known professionally as Andy García, is a Cuban-born American actor, director and musician. He first rose to prominence acting in Brian De Palma's The Untouchables (1987) alongside Kevin Costner, Sean Connery, and Robert De Niro. He continued to act in films such as Stand and Deliver (1988), and Internal Affairs (1990). He then starred in Francis Ford Coppola's The Godfather Part III (1990) as Vincent Mancini alongside Al Pacino, Diane Keaton, and Eli Wallach. He won a Latin Grammy in 2005 and received an Academy Award nomination for Best Supporting Actor for his performance.

He continued to act in Hollywood films such as Stephen Frears' Hero (1992), the romantic drama When a Man Loves a Woman (1994), and the action thriller Desperate Measures (1998). In 2000, he produced and acted in the HBO television film, For Love or Country: The Arturo Sandoval Story (2000), where he received a Primetime Emmy Award and a Golden Globe Award nominations. He also starred in Steven Soderbergh's Ocean's Eleven (2001) and its sequels, Ocean's Twelve (2004) and Ocean's Thirteen (2007). In 2005, García directed and starred in the film The Lost City alongside Dustin Hoffman and Bill Murray. He also starred in New York, I Love You (2008), the dramedy City Island (2009), the romantic comedy At Middleton (2013), and the crime thriller Kill the Messenger (2014). In recent years he has had a career resurgence in such films as Mamma Mia! Here We Go Again, Book Club, The Mule (all 2018), the HBO television movie My Dinner with Hervé (2018), and Father of the Bride (2022).

Early life
García was born Andrés Arturo García Menéndez in Havana, Cuba. His mother, Amelie Menéndez, was an English teacher and his father, René García Núñez, was an attorney in Cuba. García has two older siblings, a sister named Tessi and a brother named René. When he was five years old, his family moved to Miami, Florida after the failed 1961 Bay of Pigs Invasion. Over a period of several years, they built up a million-dollar perfume/fragrance company. García was raised as a Catholic and attended Miami Beach Senior High School, where he played on the basketball team. During his senior year of high school, he became ill with mononucleosis, which convinced him to pursue a career in acting. He began his acting career that year by taking a drama class with Jay W. Jensen. He graduated from Florida International University.

Career

1980s 
García began acting at Florida International University but soon went to Hollywood. He had a short role alongside Angela Lansbury in the first episode of Murder, She Wrote as "1st white tough", in 1984. He played the role of a gang member in the first episode of TV series Hill Street Blues. He appeared in a supporting role in The Mean Season in 1985, alongside Kurt Russell.

In 1987, Garciá received an acting breakthrough in Brian De Palma's crime drama The Untouchables. The film starred Kevin Costner, Sean Connery, Charles Martin Smith, Patricia Clarkson, and Robert De Niro. The film follows Eliot Ness as he forms the Untouchables law enforcement team to bring Al Capone to justice during the Prohibition era. It received widespread critical acclaim and was a financial success.

In 1989, García acted in the Ridley Scott action thriller Black Rain with Michael Douglas. The film received mixed reviews from critics but was a financial success earning $134 million.

1990s
In 1989, Francis Ford Coppola cast García as Vincent Mancini, the illegitimate son of Sonny Corleone, in The Godfather Part III (1990). The film stars Al Pacino, Diane Keaton, and Eli Wallach. The film concludes the story of Michael Corleone, the patriarch of the Corleone family, who attempts to legitimize his criminal empire. For his performance, García earned an Academy Award for Best Supporting Actor nomination, as well as a Golden Globe Award nomination.

In the 1990s, García appeared in the Mike Figgis film Internal Affairs, in which he engages in a battle of wits with a corrupt fellow police officer, played by Richard Gere. In 1992, he played a cynical everyman in Stephen Frears' Hero starring Dustin Hoffman, Geena Davis, and Joan Cusack. In 1994, he played the enabling husband of an alcoholic played by Meg Ryan in When a Man Loves a Woman. In 1995, he portrayed a tragic criminal in Things to Do in Denver When You're Dead alongside Christopher Lloyd, Steve Buscemi, and Christopher Walken. He starred as a hotshot lawyer in the 1996 Sidney Lumet drama Night Falls on Manhattan alongside Richard Dreyfus, and James Gandolfini. He played mobster Lucky Luciano in Hoodlum (1997) alongside Tim Roth, and Laurence Fishburne. He portrayed a cop trying to save his gravely ill son in the 1998 action thriller Desperate Measures starring Michael Keaton and Marcia Gay Harden.

2000s

In 2000, García starred and produced the HBO film, For Love or Country: The Arturo Sandoval Story. The film is about Cuba's jazz scene and the life of trumpeter and composer Arturo Sandoval. It starred Gloria Estefan as Maria, and Charles S. Dutton as jazz legend Dizzy Gillespie. For his performance, García received Primetime Emmy Award and Golden Globe Award nominations.

He portrayed the arrogant Las Vegas casino owner Terry Benedict in Steven Soderbergh's Ocean's Eleven (2001), a remake of the 1960 Rat Pack caper movie starring George Clooney, Brad Pitt, Matt Damon, and Julia Roberts. The film was a massive commercial success earning $450 million at the box office. He also appeared in the sequel, Ocean's Twelve (2004), and in the third film, Ocean's Thirteen (2007).

He co-wrote, directed, and starred in The Lost City alongside Dustin Hoffman and Bill Murray. In 2006, he appeared in the last episode of the Turkish TV series Kurtlar Vadisi, along with Sharon Stone. In 2008, he starred in the first segment of New York, I Love You which was directed by Jiang Wen starring Hayden Christensen and Rachel Bilson.

Since 2009, García has been slated to direct the film Hemingway & Fuentes about writer Ernest Hemingway, co-written by García and Hemingway's niece Hilary Hemingway. They secured financing for the film in 2012, and García himself, Anthony Hopkins, and Annette Bening were announced as stars. Filming was originally to have begun in January 2013, but due to delays, Hopkins left the project in 2014 and was replaced by Jon Voight.

2010s
Towards the end of the 2010s, García had a career resurgence. He starred in four films in 2018.

He appeared as Fernando Cienfuegos in the critical and commercial success Mamma Mia! Here We Go Again alongside Cher, Amanda Seyfried, Lily James, Colin Firth, Stellan Skarsgaard, and Pierce Brosnan. When asked about singing with Cher, García told NBC's Today show, "It was sublime. One thing is to act with Cher who is a great actress and then to be asked to sing with her".

García also starred in the Paramount romantic comedy, Book Club, alongside Diane Keaton, Candice Bergen, Jane Fonda, and Mary Steenburgen. The film was a box office success grossing over $89 million worldwide against its $10 million budget.

He also starred in Clint Eastwood's drama film, The Mule alongside Eastwood, Bradley Cooper, Dianne Wiest, Laurence Fishburne and Michael Peña. It grossed $174.8 million and received positive reviews from critics.

García appeared in the HBO movie My Dinner with Hervé alongside Peter Dinklage and Jamie Dornan. The film received generally positive reviews from critics, and received an Emmy nomination for Outstanding Television Movie.

2020s 
In 2020, García starred in Charles McDougall's comedic film Ana. Also that year, he starred in Thor Freudenthal's critically acclaimed coming of age drama Words on Bathroom Walls. The following year, he made an uncredited cameo in the comedy film Barb and Star Go to Vista Del Mar starring Kirsten Wiig and Jamie Dornan. That same year, he starred in the action films Redemption Day and the Guy Ritchie film Wrath of Man. 

In 2022 he starred in the comedy Big Gold Brick. He also starred opposite Gloria Estefan in the romantic comedy HBO Max film Father of the Bride. It is the third filmed version of the 1949 novel of the same name by Edward Streeter.Time praised García on his comedic turn writing, "Garcia carries the film ably with his gruff elegance". 

García will appear in the action film The Expendables 4 as a CIA agent.

Personal life
In 1982, García married Marivi Lorido. They have four children: three daughters, including actress Dominik García-Lorido, and a son. The family divides their time between Toluca Lake, Los Angeles and Key Biscayne, Florida.

García has often expressed his distaste for the communist regime that has ruled Cuba since the revolution that occurred there from 1953 to 1959. Following Fidel Castro's death in November 2016, García criticized his legacy, stating: "It is necessary for me to express the deep sorrow that I feel for all the Cuban people...that have suffered the atrocities and repression caused by Fidel Castro and his totalitarian regime."

García is Catholic, and a naturalized citizen of the United States.

Filmography

Film

Television

Awards and nominations

Miscellaneous awards

Other honors
 1995: Received a Star on the Hollywood Walk of Fame
 2002: Desert Palm Achievement Award at the Palm Springs International Film Festival
 2006: Received the Anthony Quinn Award for Achievement in Motion Pictures from The American Latino Media Arts Award
 2019: Medalla de Oro al Mérito en las Bellas Artes

See also

 List of Cuban Americans
 List of people from Miami

References

External links and further reading

 
 
 
 
 
 
 
 Andy Garcia at The Independent Institute

1956 births
20th-century American male actors
21st-century American male actors
American entertainers of Cuban descent
American male film actors
American male television actors
American Roman Catholics
Cuban emigrants to the United States
Cuban anti-communists
American anti-communists
Florida International University people
Hispanic and Latino American male actors
Living people
Male actors from Miami
Miami Beach Senior High School alumni
Opposition_to_Fidel_Castro
People from Havana
People from Toluca Lake, Los Angeles